Charles is a masculine given name predominantly found in English and French speaking countries. It is from the French form Charles of the Proto-Germanic name  (in runic alphabet) or *karilaz (in Latin alphabet), whose meaning was "free man". The Old English descendant of this word was Ċearl or Ċeorl, as the name of King Cearl of Mercia, that disappeared after the Norman conquest of England.

The name was notably borne by Charlemagne (Charles the Great), and was at the time Latinized as Karolus (as in Vita Karoli Magni), later also as Carolus. Some Germanic languages, for example Dutch and German, have  retained the word in two separate senses. In the particular case of Dutch, Karel refers to the given name, whereas the noun kerel means "a bloke, fellow, man".

Etymology
The name's etymology is a Common Germanic noun *karilaz meaning "free man", which survives in English as churl (< Old English ċeorl), which developed its deprecating sense in the Middle English period.

In the form Charles, the initial spelling ch- corresponds to the palatalization of the Latin group ca- to [tʃa] in Central Old French (Francien) and the final -s to the former subjective case (cas sujet) of masculine names in Old French like in Giles or James (< Latin -us, see Spanish/ Portuguese Carlos).

According to Julius Pokorny, the historical linguist and Indo-Europeanist, the root meaning of Charles is "old man", from Indo-European *ĝer-, where the ĝ is a palatal consonant, meaning "to rub; to be old; grain." An old man has been worn away and is now grey with age.

In some Slavic languages, the name Drago (and variants: Dragomir, Dragoslav, etc., all based on the root drag 'dear') has been used as an equivalent for Charles (Karel, etc.). This is based on the false etymology deriving Carl from Latin carus 'dear'. Examples are the Slovene politician Karel Dežman (1821–1889), also known as Dragotin Dežman, and the Slovene historian Dragotin Lončar (1876–1954), baptized Carl.

History

Early Middle Ages
The name is atypical for Germanic names as it is not composed of two elements, but simply a noun meaning "(free) man". This meaning of ceorl contrasts with eorl (Old Norse jarl) "nobleman" on one hand and with  þeow (Old Norse þræll) "bondsman, slave" on the other. As such it would not seem a likely candidate for the name of a Germanic king, but it is attested as such with Cearl of Mercia (fl. 620),  the first Mercian king mentioned by Bede in his Historia ecclesiastica gentis Anglorum. It is a peculiarity of the Anglo-Saxon royal names that many of the rulers of the earliest period (6th to 7th centuries) have monothematic (simplex) names, while the standard dithematic (compounded) names become almost universal from the 8th century. Compare the name of king Mul of Kent (7th century) which simply translates to "mule".

Charles Martel (686–741) was an illegitimate son of Pepin of Herstal, and therefore indeed a "free man", but not of noble rank. After his victory at the Battle of Soissons (718), Charles Martel styled himself Duke of the Franks. Charles' eldest son was named Carloman (c. 710–754), a rare example of the element carl- occurring in a compound name. 
The Chronicle of Fredegar names an earlier Carloman as the father of Pepin of Landen, and thus the great-great-grandfather of the Charles Martel. This would place the name Carloman in the 6th century, and open the possibility that the Frankish name Carl may originate as a short form of Carloman. The only other compound name with the Carl- prefix is Carlofred (Carlefred), attested in the 7th century; as a suffix, it occurs in the rare names Altcarl and Gundecarl (9th and 11th centuries, respectively).

Charlemagne (742–814) was Charles Martel's grandson. After Charlemagne's reign, the name became irrevocably connected with him and his Carolingian dynasty.
After Charlemagne, the name Charles (Karol) became even the standard word for "king" in Slavic (Czech and Slovak král, Polish król; South Slavic kral крал, krȃlj краљ; Russian король), Baltic (Latvian karalis, Lithuanian karalius) and Hungarian (király).

Charlemagne's son Charles the Younger died without issue, but the name resurfaces repeatedly within the 9th-century Carolingian family tree, so with Charles the Bald (823–877), Charles the Fat (839–888) Charles of Provence (845–863), Charles the Child (847/848–866) and Charles the Simple (879–929).

Later Middle Ages and Early Modern history
The name survives into the High Middle Ages (Charles, Duke of Lower Lorraine; Charles, Count of Valois; Charles I, Count of Flanders (Charles the Good, beatified in 1882); Charles I of Naples; Charles I of Hungary). Karl Sverkersson was a king of Sweden in the 12th century, counted as "Charles VII" due to a genealogical fiction of the 17th century by Charles "IX", but actually the first king of Sweden with this name.

Charles resurfaces as a royal name in Germany with Charles IV, Holy Roman Emperor (1316–1378, counted as "the fourth" after Charlemagne, Charles the Bald and Charles the Fat) and in France with Charles IV of France (1294–1328, "the fourth" after Charlemagne, Charles the Bald and Charles the Simple), and becomes comparatively widespread in the Late Middle Ages (Charles I, Duke of Savoy, Charles III, Duke of Savoy).

Charles V, Holy Roman Emperor (1500–1558) gives rise to a tradition of Charlses in Habsburg Spain (Charles VI, Holy Roman Emperor, Charles II of Spain, Charles III of Spain, Charles IV of Spain).

The numbering scheme for the kings of Sweden was continued in modern times with Charles X, Charles XI,  Charles XII, Charles XIII, Charles XIV and Charles XV.

Charles I of England (1600–1649) is followed by Charles II of England (1630–1685). The Province of Carolina is named during the rule of Charles II, after Charles I.

Charles III Philip, Elector Palatine (1661–1742).

Modern history
Carlism is a political movement in Spain seeking the establishment of a separate line of the Bourbon family on the Spanish throne. This line descended from Infante Carlos, Count of Molina (1788–1855), and was founded due to dispute over the succession laws and widespread dissatisfaction with the Alfonsine line of the House of Bourbon. The movement was at its strongest in the 1830s, causing the Carlist Wars, and had a revival following Spain's defeat in the Spanish–American War in 1898, and lasted until the end of the Franco regime in 1975 as a social and political force

Charles Floyd (1782–1804) was the only casualty  in the Lewis and Clark Expedition. Charles DeRudio (1832–1910) was an Italian aristocrat, would-be assassin of Napoleon III, and later a career U.S. Army officer who fought in the 7th U.S. Cavalry at the Battle of the Little Bighorn. Charles Albert Varnum (1849–1936) was the commander of the scouts in the Little Bighorn Campaign and received the Medal of Honor for his actions in a conflict following the Battle of Wounded Knee.
"Lonesome" Charley Reynolds (1842–1876) was a scout in the U.S. 7th Cavalry Regiment who was killed at the Battle of the Little Bighorn.

Carl has been a very popular male given name in the United States during the late 19th to early 20th centuries, consistently ranking in the top 30 male given names in the US from 1887 to 1938, and remaining among the top 100 until the 1980s, but since declining below rank 500. Charles has always been among the top 100 names in the U.S. since records started in 1880. In addition, it is among the top 100 names given in England and Wales; the current King of the United Kingdom and the other Commonwealth realms, Charles III, is a notable bearer of the name.

Derived feminine names
Caroline and Charlotte are feminine given names derived from Carl.

Charlotte is late medieval, e.g. Charlotte of Savoy (1441–1483), Charlotte of Cyprus (1444–1487). It was introduced to Britain in the 17th century, and gave rise to hypocorisms such as Lottie, Tottie, Totty.

Caroline is early modern,  e.g. Caroline of Ansbach (1683–1737). It has  given rise to numerous variations, such as  Carlyn, Carolina, Carolyn, Karolyn, Carolin, Karolina, Karoline, Karolina, Carolien, as well as hypocorisms, such as Callie, Carol, Carrie, etc.

Another derived feminine name is Carla (Bulgarian, Catalan, Dutch, English, German, Italian, Portuguese, Spanish), a name which dates from early Italy.

Regional forms:
 Carolina (Italian, Portuguese, Spanish, Swedish, Bulgarian)
 Caroline (English, French, Swedish, Danish, Dutch)
 Carolyn (English)
 Carlijn (Dutch)
 Karoliina (Finnish)
 Karolina (Bulgarian, Polish, Swedish)
 Karolína (Czech)
 Karoline (Danish, Norwegian, Swedish)
 Karolina (Каролина) (Russian)
 Keraleyn (קעראַליין) (Yiddish)
 Carly (American)
 Carol (English)
 Carola (German, Swedish)
 Carole (English, French, Portuguese)
 Karol (קאַראָל) (Yiddish)
 Kyārōla (क्यारोल) (Nepali)
 Kerol (Керол) (Serbian), (Russian)
 Charlotte (English, French, German, Swedish, Danish, Dutch)
 Carlota (Spanish, Portuguese, Catalan)
 Carlotta (Italian)
 Charlotta (Swedish)
 Carla
 Charla (English)
 Karla (Bulgarian, German, Scandinavian, Serbian, Czech, Croatian)
 Карла (Bulgarian, Russian, Serbian)
 Charlene (given name), Charlène

Regional forms of the name

List of notable people

Media, arts and entertainment
In literature

In music

In film

In television

In visual arts

Other areas of media, arts and entertainment

Athletes

In politics

In religion

Saints

There are a number of historical figures known as "Saint Charles", although few are recognized across confessions. 
In the context of English and British history, "Saint Charles" is typically Charles I of England, recognized as a saint in the Anglican confession only. 
In Roman Catholicism, the best known Saint Charles is Charles Borromeo (1538–1584), an Italian cardinal, canonized by Pope Paul V in 1606.
Charles, Duke of Brittany (1319–1364) had been canonized after his death, but Pope Gregory XI annulled this. Charles the Good (d. 1127) is sometimes referred to as a saint, but while he was beatified in 1904, he has not been canonized.

Other Saints of the Roman Catholic Church, canonized after 1900:
1904: Saint Charles Garnier (1606–1649), French Jesuit missionary and martyr
1959: Saint Charles of Sezze (1616–1670), Franciscan lay brother
1964: Saint Charles Lwanga (1860 or 1865–1886), Ugandan Catholic martyr
1995: Saint Charles-Joseph-Eugène de Mazenod (1782–1861), French Catholic clergyman
2007: Saint Charles of Mount Argus (1821–1818), Passionist Dutch priest who worked in Ireland

Beatified:
1867: Blessed Charles Spinola (1564–1622), Genoese nobleman
2004: Blessed Charles I of Austria (1887-1922), last emperor of Austria, king of Hungary, Bohemia, etc.

Church leaders 
Charles Wesley (1707–1788), co-founder of the Methodist movement and writer of thousands of hymns
Charles Grandison Finney (1792–1875), a leader of the Second Great Awakening in America
Charles W. Penrose (1832–1925), leader in The Church of Jesus Christ of Latter-day Saints
Charles Haddon Spurgeon (1834–1892), Reformed Baptist preacher
Charles Harrison Mason (1866–1961), Pentecostal preacher and founder of the Church of God in Christ

Nobility
See #History above for medieval and early modern royalty and nobility. This section lists noblemen born after 1700.

Charles d'Ursel
Charles-Joseph, 4th Duke d'Ursel
Charles I, Duke of Brunswick-Wolfenbüttel (1713–1780)
Charles III of Spain (1716–1788),  first son of the second marriage of Philip V with Elizabeth Farnese of Parma
"Bonnie Prince Charlie" Charles Edward Stuart (1720–1788), exiled claimant to the thrones of England, Scotland, and Ireland
Charles Cornwallis, 1st Marquess Cornwallis (1738–1805), English military commander and colonial governor
Charles XIII of Sweden (1748–1818), king of Sweden, the second son of King Adolf Frederick of Sweden and Louisa Ulrika of Prussia
Charles Emmanuel IV of Sardinia (1751–1819)
Charles IV of Spain (1748–1819), king of Spain from December 14, 1788, until his abdication on March 19, 1808
Charles XIV John of Sweden (1763–1844), king of Sweden and Norway. Former Jean-Baptiste Bernadotte, Marshal of France
Infante Carlos, Count of Molina (1788–1855)
Charles, Count Léon (1806–1881), illegitimate son of Emperor Napoleon I of France and Catherine Eléonore Denuelle de la Plaigne
Charles III, Prince of Monaco (1818–1889), founder of the casino in Monte Carlo
Infante Carlos, Count of Montemolin (1818–1861)
Charles I of Romania (1839–1914) first ruler of the Hohenzollern-Sigmaringen dynasty
Carlos, Duke of Madrid (1848–1909)
Charles I of Portugal (1863–1908), second to last King of Portugal and Algarves from 1889 to 1908
Charles I of Austria (1887–1922), Emperor of Austria
Charles II of Romania (1893-1853), eldest son of Ferdinand I
Charles XV of Sweden (1826–1872), king of Sweden, the eldest son of King Oscar I and Josephine of Leuchtenberg
Prince Charles of Belgium (1903–1983), second son of King Albert I of Belgium and Queen Elizabeth
Archduke Karl Pius of Austria, Prince of Tuscany (1909–1953)
Carlos Hugo, Duke of Parma (1930–2010)
Juan Carlos I of Spain (b. 1938), former King of Spain
Charles III, King of the United Kingdom (b. 1948),  eldest son of Queen Elizabeth II and Prince Philip, Duke of Edinburgh

Scientists

Other
Architecture
Charles Barry, designer of the rebuilt Palace of Westminster
Charles Barry Jr., his son
Charles Thaddeus Russell (1875-1952), African American architect from Richmond, Virginia

Aviation and Aerospace
Charles Lindbergh, first person to fly solo non-stop across the Atlantic Ocean
Chuck Yeager, American test pilot and first man to break the sound barrier
 
Entrepreneurs and businessmen
Don Charles Gemoris Attygalle (1836–1901), Sri Lankan Sinhala entrepreneur and mine owner
Charles Henry de Soysa (1836–1890), Sri Lankan Sinhala planter and philanthropist
Charles Keating, American financier, instigator of the "Keating 5" scandal
Charles Macalester, businessman, banker, philanthropist, namesake of Macalester College
Charles M. Schwab, founder of Bethlehem Steel
Charles R. Schwab, stock-broker and founder of the Charles Schwab Corporation
Charles Zadok (1897–1984), American businessman, art collector and patron

Military personnel
Charles Upham, most-decorated Commonwealth serviceman of World War Two

Criminals
Charles A. Salvador (born Michael Peterson; better known as Charles Bronson), notorious English prisoner 
Charles Cullen, American serial killer and former nurse
Charles Gibbs, 19th-century pirate
Charles J. Guiteau, American assassin of 20th President James A. Garfield
Charles Hudspeth, American man convicted of murder
Charles "Charlie" Lawson, American mass murderer and family annihilator
Charles Manson, American cult leader, convicted murder conspirator
Charles "Carl" Panzram, American serial killer 
Charles Ponzi, Italian-American con-man, gave name to Ponzi scheme
Charles Sobhraj, Indian serial killer
Charles Starkweather, American teenage spree killer
Charles Whitman, American spree killer and former Marine

Other uses of the name
Carolus (coin)
"Charles", a short story by Shirley Jackson
Charley horse, a biophysical condition

See also

Carl (name)
Carles (name)
Charley (disambiguation)
Charlie (disambiguation)
Charls
Charly (disambiguation)
Chuck (disambiguation)
Charleston (disambiguation)
Charlestown (disambiguation)
Saint Charles (disambiguation)
Chas (disambiguation)

References

English given names
English masculine given names
English-language masculine given names
French masculine given names
Given names